Hednota panselenella is a moth in the family Crambidae. It was described by Edward Meyrick in 1882. It is found in Australia, where it has been recorded from New South Wales, Victoria and Tasmania.

References

Crambinae
Moths described in 1882